White Star Real Estate, formerly AIG/Lincoln, is an international real estate development company that was established in 1997 as a strategic partnership between AIG Global Real Estate Investment Corporation and Lincoln Property Company of Dallas, Texas.

History

AIG/Lincoln was formed to acquire, develop and manage real estate properties internationally.

While its initial focus was on the emerging markets of Central & Eastern Europe, it has since expanded into Western Europe, and currently has offices in: Czech Republic; Germany; Hungary; Italy; Poland; Romania; Bulgaria; Russia (see White Square, White Gardens, and The Park Northpoint); Slovakia; and, Spain.

In 2015, AIG/Lincoln was acquired by White Star.

In 2021, White Star Logistics, a joint venture between White Star Real Estate and Bain Capital, opened two centers in Poland.

Operations

AIG/Lincoln employs local, in-country teams of experts to make a full range of development-related decisions pertaining to local development projects, including those related to: design, permitting, construction, financing, accounting, funding, leasing, and marketing. Meanwhile, an international service team in the company’s European headquarters, located in Warsaw, Poland, provides support for each country’s operations.

As of 2012, AIG/Lincoln has developed, or is in the process of developing, over 50 projects, totaling over 2.5 million square meters (approx. 27 million sq. ft.) of real estate. It has developed a wide range of properties, including office, industrial, retail, and entertainment, as well as build-to-suit projects.

In addition to its development activities, AIG/Lincoln also operates as a property manager, both of properties it has developed, as well as those developed by others. It currently manages approximately 1.5 million square meters (approx. 16 million sq. ft.) of office, industrial, retail, residential, and entertainment property across Europe.

References

Real estate companies of the United States
Companies based in Warsaw
Real estate companies established in 1997
American International Group
Real estate companies of Poland